Anadasmus paurocentra is a moth of the family Depressariidae. It is found in Colombia.

The wingspan is 28–34 mm. The forewings are light brownish-ochreous with the costal edge yellow-whitish and the plical and second discal stigmata blackish. There is a curved subterminal series of dots indicated by two or three blackish scales each, not reaching either margin. The hindwings are whitish-fuscous.

References

Moths described in 1912
Anadasmus
Moths of South America